Mastronardi is a surname of Italian origin. Notable people with the surname include:

 Alessandra Mastronardi (born 1986), Italian actress
 Bart Mastronardi, American director, screenwriter, cinematographer and producer
 Carlos Mastronardi (1901–1976), Argentine journalist, poet, and translator
 Horace Mastronardi, Swiss lawyer who tried to have the verdict of the Jaccoud case overturned

Italian-language surnames